Jason Robert Solowsky (born November 9, 1977) is an American music composer for film and television. A classical pianist and guitar player, his compositions can be heard in over 100 films, many of which have been released by Lionsgate, Sony Pictures, Universal Pictures, and Anchor Bay Entertainment among others.

Life and career
Born in Boston, Massachusetts, Solowsky graduated from Newton South High School in 1995. He earned his bachelor of music degree from Berklee College of Music in both film scoring and composition. He also graduated from the USC Thornton School of Music (Los Angeles, CA) scoring for motion pictures and television program where he studied with film composers such as Christopher Young, Elmer Bernstein and David Raksin.

Solowsky composed the score for several feature films including, Between Worlds (Nicolas Cage and Franka Potente),The Freemason (Sean Astin and Randy Wayne), Lionsgate's Assassin's Game (Tom Sizemore, Bai Ling and Vivica A. Fox), Sony Pictures Home Entertainment's Forgiveness (Richard T. Jones), Falsely Accused (Rosanna Arquette and Jon Gries), Unsullied (Rusty Joiner, which is directed by former NFL star Simeon Rice), Terror Inside (Corey Feldman and Tanya Memme), American Bandits: Frank and Jesse James (Peter Fonda, George Stults and Jeffrey Combs), Turbulent Skies (Casper Van Dien, Nicole Eggert, Brad Dourif, and Patrick Muldoon), and Templar Nation (Erik Estrada). He also has music featured in the Sony Pictures film American Crude (Rob Schneider, Ron Livingston, Michael Clarke Duncan, and Jennifer Esposito). In addition, he scored the films What Up? (Kadeem Hardison), and Unemployed which were both distributed by Lionsgate.

Other scores by Solowsky include the films Annabel Lee, Nightbeasts (Zach Galligan), Cage Free (Dee Wallace), Dust of Life and For Love of Amy (directed by Ted Lange). Solowsky also scored the award-winning film Call To Action (Lily Tomlin).

Solowsky's music was featured in the Universal Pictures film, A Question of Faith (Richard T. Jones, C. Thomas Howell, Renee O'Connor, Kim Fields and Gregory Alan Williams).

Personal life
Jason has been married to his wife Nina Solowsky (née Menezes) since 2009.

Select filmography

References

External links

1977 births
American film score composers
American male film score composers
Berklee College of Music alumni
USC Thornton School of Music alumni
Musicians from Boston
Living people